Lord Lansdowne may refer to:

George Granville, 1st Baron Lansdowne (1666–1735), English poet, playwright and politician
Marquess of Lansdowne, a title in the Peerage of Great Britain
William Petty, 1st Marquess of Lansdowne (1737–1805), former British prime minister
 Henry Petty-Fitzmaurice, 5th Marquess of Lansdowne (1845–1927), the fifth Governor General of Canada, former Viceroy of India, former Secretary of State for War, and former Secretary of State for Foreign Affairs